Hebei Zhongrun Pharmaceutical Co., Ltd (CSPC Zhongrun) is one of China's largest producers of bulk antibiotic active pharmaceutical ingredients. CSPC Zhongrun produces both penicillin and cephalosporin series API.

A joint venture established in 1989 by China Pharmaceutical Group Ltd (CHINA PHARMA), CSPC Zhongrun employs more than 3,600 workers.

CSPC Zhongrun penicillin and cephalosporin Beta-lactam antibiotic products include 16 varieties of API and intermediates. The penicillin series includes penicillin G potassium crude, penicillin G potassium, penicillin G sodium, 6-APA, amoxicillin trihydrate, ampicillin trihydrate and ampicillin sodium.

The cephalosporin series includes intermediate 7-ACA, cefazolin sodium, cefazolin acid and ceftriaxone sodium. Meropenem API is also produced.

External links

Pharmaceutical companies of China
Companies based in Hebei
Pharmaceutical companies  established in 1989
Chinese companies established in 1989